The Boeing Orbital Flight Test-2 (also known as Boe OFT-2) was a repeat of Boeing's unsuccessful first Orbital Flight Test (OFT-1) of its Starliner spacecraft. The uncrewed mission was part of NASA's Commercial Crew Program. OFT-2, using Starliner Spacecraft 2, launched 19 May 2022 and lasted 6 days. Starliner successfully docked with the International Space Station (ISS) on 21 May 2022. It stayed at the ISS for 4 days before undocking and landing in the White Sands Missile Range on 25 May 2022.

Payload 
Some of the cargo included flags from historically black colleges and universities and pins of Rosie the Riveter and 16 EMU water absorption pads.

Starliner was loaded with 500 pounds of cargo to bring to the ISS–mostly food with some small EVA components. Astronauts unloaded this cargo and replaced it with 600 pounds of nitrogen-oxygen recharge tanks to take down. Once on the ground, the tanks were to be refurbished and then flown again.

Starliner again carried the Anthropomorphic Test Device (ATD) Rosie (aka "Rosie the Rocketeer") for its second flight. It also carried a plush toy of Kerbal Space Program character Jebediah Kerman as a zero-G indicator.

Mission 
The first flight of Starliner after the December 2019 OFT-1 flight failed to rendezvous with the station due to software problems. Boeing and NASA agreed on another uncrewed flight test of the spacecraft's systems. As part of the original fixed-price contract this flight was paid by Boeing, at an estimated out-of-pocket cost to Boeing of US$410 million. The mission was planned to use the hardware, Starliner spacecraft, and Atlas V originally planned for use on the Boe-CFT crewed flight test.

The second Atlas V N22, designated AV-082, launched the Starliner spacecraft on its second uncrewed test flight to the International Space Station. The capsule is intended to dock with the space station, then return to Earth to land in the Western United States after an orbital shakedown cruise ahead of Boeing Crewed Flight Test.

OFT-2 is the second flight of an Atlas V without a payload fairing and with a dual-engine Centaur upper stage. The dual-engine Centaur uses two RL10s and is required for Starliner flights in order to provide a launch trajectory that allows a safe abort at any point in the mission.

Boeing modified the design of the Starliner docking system after the OFT-1 flight, adding a hinged re-entry cover below the expendable nosecone for additional protection during the capsule's fiery descent through the atmosphere similar to the one used in the SpaceX Dragon 2 nosecone. This was tested on the OFT-2 mission.  This flight also marked the first time that NASA's docking system was used for docking by a commercial spacecraft, as Dragon’s docking system was designed by SpaceX themselves.

Launch delays 

On 9 December 2020, NASA and Boeing announced that 29 March 2021 was the targeted launch date for the OFT-2 mission. On 16 December 2020, Boeing officials released the official mission patch for the Orbital Flight Test-2 mission. On 18 January 2021, Boeing and NASA announced that they have re-certified Starliner's spacecraft software for the OFT-2 mission. In February 2021, the launch date shifted to 25 March 2021, then 2 April 2021, then mid April 2021. During April 2021, the launch was scheduled for August/September 2021, with an exact date to be determined. In May 2021, the launch was scheduled for 30 July 2021.

Prior to the OFT-2 launch attempt, the Crew Dragon Endeavour, which was docked to ISS at "Harmony" forward port for its Crew-2 mission, undocked at 10:45 UTC and relocated to "Harmony" zenith port on 21 July 2021, at 11:35 UTC. The OFT-2 launch was scheduled for 30 July 2021 at 18:53:32 UTC. On 27 July 2021, NASA, Boeing, and ULA completed the Flight Readiness Review (FRR) for the mission.

On 29 July 2021, launch preparations were under way at Cape Canaveral Space Launch Complex 41. The Atlas V with the Starliner atop had just been rolled out from the Vertical Integration Facility (VIF) to the pad. In an entirely separate mission, the Nauka module had docked at the space station earlier that morning, but its thrusters misfired, causing serious anomalies that would make the OFT-2 docking impossible until they were corrected. The Atlas V was immediately rolled back to the VIF, and the launch time was delayed to 3 August 2021 at 17:20:18 UTC.

Valve failures, August 2021

Atlas V was rolled out again 2 August 2021. The 3 August launch attempt was scrubbed due to technical problems with the propulsion system on Starliner causing another 24 hours recycle, with launch planned for 4 August 2021 at 16:57 UTC. Due to unexpected valve position indications in the Starliner propulsion system, the launch was further delayed to later in August while engineering teams investigated the problem. As a result, the Atlas V was rolled back to the VIF again for further testing. On 13 August 2021, Boeing decided to return the spacecraft back to the Commercial Crew and Cargo Processing Facility in order to perform a deeper-level troubleshooting of the thirteen propulsion system valves, causing the launch to be delayed for another year. The time needed for analysis and correction of the problem forced the launch to be delayed until the launch complex was once again available in May 2022.

Relaunch attempt

After completing assembly of the rocket again at ULA's VIF, the launch took place on 19 May 2022 at 22:54 UTC, and completed the Orbital Insertion Burn at 31 minutes into the mission. During the Orbit Insertion Burn, two OMAC thrusters out of the twelve thrusters in the service module failed shortly after ignition, but Boeing says it does not pose a threat as on-board flight control system took over the situation and switched to backup thrusters to complete the burn successfully, and Starliner reached a good orbit.  26 hours and 34 minutes after the beginning of the mission, Starliner achieved soft capture on its first docking attempt. 20 minutes later, the spacecraft achieved hard capture. Docking took place after a delay of about one hour, due to a need to retract and re-extend the ring clamp on its NDS docking interface. On 21 May at 16:04 UTC, the hatch was opened for the first time. On 24 May at 19:00 UTC the hatch was closed in preparation for departure. On 25 May at 18:36 UTC, Starliner undocked from the ISS and successfully landed in White Sands, New Mexico at 22:49 UTC.

Gallery

See also 
 Crew Dragon Demo-1, SpaceX's first (uncrewed) orbital mission for its crew capsule

References

External links 

 Astronaut Doug Hines enters the Boeing Starliner for the first time during OFT-2
 Starliner CST-100 updates published by Boeing 
 Official Webpage of the CST-100 Starliner 
 Launch Schedule by Spaceflight Now
 NASA Live: Official Stream of NASA TV

Boeing Starliner
Supply vehicles for the International Space Station
Spacecraft launched in 2022
2022 in the United States
Test spaceflights